Graig (in Welsh "rock") may refer to:

Places
Graig, Newport, an electoral ward and coterminous community of Newport, South Wales
Graig, Pontypridd, a historic district of Pontypridd, South Wales
Graig, Llanarmon-yn-Ial, a Site of Special Scientific Interest in Clwyd, North Wales

People
Graig Nettles (born 1944), American baseball player
Graig Newman (born 1989), Canadian football player